The Convent of San Domenico is a Dominican convent in Fiesole, Italy, situated between the hill of Fiesole and the suburbs of Florence. It was founded in 1406 and completed in 1435 on the initiative of Giovanni Dominici and the bishop of Fiesole, Jacopo Altoviti, both of them friars at the Basilica of Santa Maria Novella in Florence.

Fra Angelico was a friar here, and painted several artworks for the convent, including the Fiesole Altarpiece and the Coronation of the Virgin (now in the Louvre of Paris).  Pietro Perugino's Madonna with Child between Saints John the Baptist and Sebastian, painted here in 1493, is now at the Uffizi Gallery in Florence. Also here is the 'Baptism' of Lorenzo di Credi, a free rendering of the Baptism in the Uffizi, the panel attributed to master Verrocchio and to Leonardo himself.

Since the 2016 Convent of San Domenico hosts Language Centre, the Human Resources Service and a part of the Budget and Financial Affairs Service of the European University Institute.

References

1406 establishments in Europe
15th-century establishments in the Republic of Florence
Dominican convents
Monasteries in Tuscany
Buildings and structures in Fiesole
European University Institute buildings
Dominican Order in Florence